Kvås is a former municipality that was located in the old Vest-Agder county in Norway.  The  municipality existed from 1909 until its dissolution in 1963. The municipality lies in what is now the central part of the municipality of Lyngdal. The administrative centre of Kvås was the village of Kvås where Kvås Church is located. Other villages in the Kvås area are Birkeland and Moi.

Name
The municipality (originally the parish) is named after the old Kvås farm, since that is where the Kvås Church was located.  The meaning of the name probably refers to a "valley" or "hollow".

History
The municipality of Kvås was established on 1 January 1909 when the old municipality of Lyngdal was divided into three new municipalities: Austad, Lyngdal, and Kvås (population: 736). During the 1960s, there were many municipal mergers across Norway due to the work of the Schei Committee. On 1 January 1963, Austad (population: 608) and Kvås (population: 493) were re-incorporated into the municipality of Lyngdal along with the Gitlevåg area of the neighboring municipality of Spangereid.

Government
All municipalities in Norway, including Kvås, are responsible for primary education (through 10th grade), outpatient health services, senior citizen services, unemployment and other social services, zoning, economic development, and municipal roads.  The municipality was governed by a municipal council of elected representatives, which in turn elected a mayor.

Municipal council
The municipal council  of Kvås was made up of representatives that were elected to four year terms.  The party breakdown of the final municipal council was as follows:

See also
List of former municipalities of Norway

References

Lyngdal
Former municipalities of Norway
1909 establishments in Norway
1963 disestablishments in Norway